Sciaphilus asperatus is a species of weevil native to Europe.

References

External links
Images representing Sciaphilus asperatus at BOLD

Curculionidae
Beetles described in 1785
Beetles of Europe